The Midwest Cowboy is the eighth solo studio album by American rapper Bizzy Bone. It was released on July 11, 2006 through Real Talk Entertainment with distribution via Koch Entertainment. Recording sessions took place at Illuminated Studios. Production was handled entirely by Playalitical except for "Thugs Need Love Too", produced with Pop Sykle. It features guest appearances from Playalitical, Spike-In-Wordz and Young Droop.

It is the third of four albums he had released in the year 2006, as a follow-up to Thugs Revenge and The Story and eventually being followed by  Evolution of Elevation. The production on the album is diverse, ranging from g-funk to synth melodies.

Track listing

Personnel
Bryon "Bizzy Bone" McCane II – main performer
Dustin "Playalitical" Robbins – featured performer (tracks: 6, 7, 12), producer, engineering, mixing, executive producer
Felisha "Heaven" Martinez – featured performer (tracks: 7, 11)
Devon "Young Droop" Bradford – featured performer (track 8)
Hector "Spoke-In Wordz" Garcia – featured performer (track 13), engineering & mixing (track 7)
Pop Sykle – producer & engineering (track 6)
Kevin Murray – engineering & mixing (track 3)
Brian "J Slikk" Mitchell-Sanders – engineering & mixing (track 8)
Anton Marquez – engineering & mixing (track 9)
John Cuniberti – mastering
Derrick A. Johnson – executive producer
Brian Bonner – art direction, design, photography
Illuminated Media – design assistant
Timothy "Beeno" Iinis – A&R

Charts

External links

References

2006 albums
Bizzy Bone albums
Real Talk Entertainment albums